Lancaster Park was a sports stadium in Christchurch, New Zealand. Lancaster Park was used as an international cricket ground from 1930, when New Zealand played England in a Test match, until its destruction in the 2011 Christchurch earthquake. The ground also hosted One Day Internationals (ODIs), the first of these was in 1973 when New Zealand played Pakistan.

61 Test centuries were scored at Lancaster Park. The South African Jim Christy scored the first century at the ground when he made 103 against New Zealand in 1932. The first Test century by a New Zealander at Lancaster Park came in 1947, scored by Walter Hadlee against England. Walter Hadlee's son, Richard Hadlee, also scored a Test century at the ground when he made 103 against the West Indies in 1980. The West Indian Seymour Nurse holds the record for the highest Test innings at the ground, Nurse made 258 against New Zealand in 1969. Graham Dowling's 239, made against India in 1968, is the highest score at Lancaster Park by a New Zealander. Nathan Astle, also from New Zealand, holds the world record for fastest Test double century, which was made at Lancaster Park in 2002. Glenn Turner was the only player to have hit 3 Test centuries at the ground.

The first ODI century made at the ground was in 1974 by the New Zealander Ken Wadsworth. Wadsworth made 104 from 98 deliveries against Australia. The Indian Sachin Tendulkar holds the record for the highest ODI innings at the ground. Tendulkar scored 163 not out from 133 deliveries against New Zealand in 2009. Three players have scored two ODI centuries at Lancaster Park: West Indian Gordon Greenidge, Australian Adam Gilchrist and New Zealander Stephen Fleming.

Brendon McCullum was the only player to have scored a Twenty20 International century at Lancaster Park. McCullum's innings of 116 not out from 56 deliveries was made against Australia in 2010.

Key
 * denotes that the batsman was not out.
 Inns. denotes the number of the innings in the match.
 Balls denotes the number of balls faced in an innings.
 NR denotes that the number of balls was not recorded.
 Parentheses next to the player's score denotes his century number at Lancaster Park.
 The column title Date refers to the date the match started.
 The column title Result refers to whether the player's team won, lost or if the match was drawn, tied, or a no result.

List of centuries

Test centuries

The following table summarises the Test centuries scored at Lancaster Park.

One Day International centuries

The following table summarises the One Day International centuries scored at Lancaster Park.

Twenty20 International centuries

The following table summarises the Twenty20 International centuries scored at Lancaster Park.

Women's Test centuries
The following table summarises the women's Test centuries scored at the Lancaster Park.

Women's One Day International centuries
The following table summarises the women's One Day International centuries scored at Lancaster Park.

References 

Lancaster Park
Cricket grounds in New Zealand
Centuries